Jana Fett (born 2 November 1996) is a Croatian tennis player. On 30 October 2017, Fett reached her best singles ranking of world No. 97, and on 21 May 2018, she reached her best doubles ranking of No. 348. Fett has won six singles and five doubles titles on the ITF Women's Circuit.

Career
On the ITF Junior Circuit, Fett had a career-high ranking of No. 12, which she achieved on 24 February 2014. She was the runner-up at the 2014 Australian Open girls' singles event, wherein she fell to Elizaveta Kulichkova in the final.

Fett's biggest title to date was at the 2015 Dunlop World Challenge, where she won the singles title, defeating Luksika Kumkhum in the final.

At the 2017 Hobart International, she qualified for her first entry to the main draw of a WTA tournament. She then lost to eventual champion and fellow qualifier, Elise Mertens.
Later in the year, she reached her second WTA semifinal at the Japan Women's Open, again coming through qualifying, while also scoring her first victory over top-20 player and top seed Kristina Mladenovic. She lost to fellow qualifier Miyu Kato after failing to convert a match point. She made her top-100 debut after this success.

At the 2018 Australian Open, she appeared in the Grand Slam main draw for the first time as a direct entrant. She played in the second round against second-seeded Caroline Wozniacki and had two matchpoints, leading 40/15 at 5–1 in the third set. However, she lost that game and the successive five games to yield the match.

She qualified for the main draw at the 2022 Wimbledon Championships after three years of absence at the All England Club where she lost to world No. 1, Iga Swiatek.

Grand Slam singles performance timeline

ITF Circuit finals

Singles: 10 (6 titles, 4 runner–ups)

Doubles: 10 (5 titles, 5 runner–ups)

Fed Cup/Billie Jean King Cup participation

Singles (0–6)

Doubles (2–0)

Junior career

Grand Slam finals

Girls' singles: 1 (runner–up)

Notes

References

External links
 
 
 

1996 births
Living people
Croatian female tennis players
Tennis players from Zagreb
21st-century Croatian women